David O'Brien is a former Irish racehorse trainer. He was the son of the successful trainer Vincent O'Brien and Jacqueline O'Brien, author and photographer.

His primary successes included Assert, who won the Irish and French Derbies, and Secreto, Derby, defeating El Gran Senor trained by his father Vincent. David O'Brien remains the youngest trainer to win the Epsom Derby, The Irish Derby and the French Derby. He was also the first foreign trainer to win this race.

He retired from training in the late 1980s and moved to France where he purchased a vineyard, Chateau Vignelaure, where he restored the reputation of the vineyard and as the winemaker won many French and international accolades.

References

Living people
Irish racehorse owners and breeders
Year of birth missing (living people)
Place of birth missing (living people)
Sportspeople from Perth, Western Australia
Irish emigrants to Australia